Events from the year 1978 in Iran.

Incumbents
 Shah: Mohammad Reza Pahlavi 
 Prime Minister: 
 until August 27: Jamshid Amouzegar
 August 27-November 6: Jafar Sharif-Emami 
 starting November 6: Gholam-Reza Azhari

Events
 8 September – Black Friday, massacre by Iranian army provoked 88 deaths.
 16 September – The 7.4  Tabas earthquake affected central Iran with a maximum Mercalli intensity of IX (Violent). At least 15,000 people were killed.

Births

 23 July – Mehdi Kiani, footballer.
 23 July – Ruhollah Zam, activist and journalist (d. 2020)
 6 May – Afshin, singer.

See also
 Years in Iraq
 Years in Afghanistan

References

 
Iran
Years of the 20th century in Iran
1970s in Iran
Iran